Shabab Al Sahel Football Club, known as Shabab Sahel or simply Sahel, is a football club based in Haret Hreik, a district in Beirut, Lebanon, that competes in the .

Founded in 1966, Shabab Al Sahel won one Lebanese FA Cup, one Lebanese Elite Cup, and two Lebanese Challenge Cups. They are predominantly supported by the Shia community.

History
Shabab Sahel was established in 1966 in Haret Hreik, a district in Beirut, Lebanon. Sherif Salim was the club's first chairman, while Hassan Hatoum was its first secretary. Within three years, the club was promoted from the Third Division to the Second Division to the Premier League. However, the Lebanese Football Association didn't approve of their promotion to the top flight.

During the Civil War, Shabab Sahel were first promoted to the Premier League. Despite being relegated back to the Second Division, they were promoted back up the following season.

The club won their first title in 2000, defeating Safa 5–4 on penalties in the Lebanese FA Cup after a 1–1 draw. In 2008–09 they reached the finals, but were defeated 2–0 by Ahed. In the 2010–11 season Shabab Sahel defeated Salam Zgharta 2–0 in the quarter-finals, but lost 2–1 in the semi-final to Safa at the Rafik Hariri Stadium in Sidon.

Shabab Sahel's best league placement came in 2020–21, when they finished third with 27 points.

Club rivalries 
Shabab Sahel's main rival have historically been Bourj, as they both fight for supremacy over the Dahieh suburbs. The match has been dubbed the Dahieh derby. Another important rivalry is with Shabab Bourj, due to the fact that they are also based in the Dahieh area.

Players

Current squad

Notable players

Honours 
Lebanese FA Cup
Winners (1): 1999–2000
Runners-up (3): 1987–88, 2008–09, 2012–13
Lebanese Elite Cup
Winners (1): 2019
Runners-up (1): 1999
Lebanese Challenge Cup
Winners (2; joint record): 2014, 2015
Lebanese Second Division
Winners (2): 2005–06, 2017–18
Lebanese Super Cup
Runners-up (2): 2000, 2013

See also 
 List of football clubs in Lebanon

Notes

References

External links

 Official website
 Shabab Al Sahel FC at Soccerway
 Shabab Al Sahel FC at LebanonFG

 
Football clubs in Lebanon
Association football clubs established in 1966
Shia Islam in Lebanon